This is a list of seasons completed by the University of Alaska Fairbanks men's ice hockey team. 

Alaska has made two NCAA tournament appearances in its history. However, as a result of NCAA rules violations, the berth in 2010 has been vacated and Alaska officially has never played in a Division I national tournament.

* Winning percentage is used when conference schedules are unbalanced.
† Alaska was required to retroactively forfeit all wins and ties from 2007 through 2012 as a result of using academically ineligible players. Additionally the team was banned from participating in any playoff games during the 2014–15 season.

Footnotes

References

 
Lists of college men's ice hockey seasons in the United States
Alaska Nanooks ice hockey seasons